Rammuka may refer to several places in Estonia:

Rammuka, Pärnu County, village in Tõstamaa Parish, Pärnu County
Rammuka, Võru County, village in Misso Parish, Võru County